Joe Horn Jr. (born September 16, 1994) is a former American football wide receiver. He played college football at Missouri Western State.

Early life and high school career 
Horn was born on September 16, 1994, in Tupelo, Mississippi. He attended and played high school football for Peachtree Ridge in Suwanee, Georgia. In 2012 as a junior, he caught 43 passes for 683 yards and seven touchdowns, while also leading the team to the state playoffs. He received multiple scholarship offers from UCLA, East Carolina, and Southern Mississippi.

College career

Northeast Mississippi 
From 2014 to 2015, Horn attended and played college football for Northeast Mississippi Community College. He caught 51 passes for 690 yards and seven touchdowns during his two-year stint.

In 2014 he was named to the Mississippi Association of Community and Junior Colleges (MACJC) All-State Second-Team. He appeared in nine games for the Tigers, catching 33 passes for 435 yards and six touchdowns. He recorded a career-high 105 receiving yards and three touchdowns in the teams 49–35 win over Northwest.

Missouri Western State 
In 2018, Horn caught fifteen passes for 246 yards, including a season-high 58 yards against Washburn.

Professional career

Baltimore Ravens
On May 14, 2019, Horn Jr. signed with the Baltimore Ravens as an undrafted free agent. He was waived during final roster cuts on August 30, 2019.

Houston Roughnecks
In October 2019, he was drafted by the Houston Roughnecks in the 2020 XFL Draft.

New York Guardians
On January 17, 2020, he was traded to the New York Guardians in exchange for wide receiver Taivon Jacobs. He had his contract terminated when the league suspended operations on April 10, 2020.

Personal life
Horn Jr. is the son of four-time Pro Bowl wide receiver Joe Horn. His brother, Jaycee Horn, is a cornerback for the Carolina Panthers.

References

External links
Baltimore Ravens bio
Missouri Western Griffins bio

Living people
1994 births
American football wide receivers
Missouri Western Griffons football players
Baltimore Ravens players
Houston Roughnecks players
New York Guardians players
Players of American football from Mississippi
Sportspeople from Tupelo, Mississippi